Yoon Dong-min is a South Korean football player, who currently plays for Jeonnam Dragons.

Club career 

Yoon joined FC Seoul as a draft pick from Kyunghee University.  But he failed to make any appearance in Seoul. He joined Busan I'Park in 2011. His first appearance for his new club was as a late substitute in Busan's away loss to Ulsan Hyundai FC in the K-League Cup, and Yoon followed this with his first league match against Seongnam Ilhwa Chunma on 3 April 2011, in which he again featured as a late match substitute.  Yoon scored his first professional goal in Busan's win over Cheonan City FC in the club's first match of the 2011 Korean FA Cup.

Club career statistics

References

External links

1988 births
Living people
Association football forwards
South Korean footballers
FC Seoul players
Busan IPark players
Gimcheon Sangmu FC players
Jeonnam Dragons players
K League 1 players
K League 2 players
Kyung Hee University alumni